Lycomorpha fulgens is a moth of the family Erebidae. It was described by Henry Edwards in 1881. It is found in North America, including Arizona, California, Colorado and New Mexico.

The wingspan is about 30 mm. The forewings are mostly red with a black margin. The hindwings are almost entirely black.

References

 

Cisthenina
Moths described in 1881